The Women's 500 m time trial was held on 19 October 2016.

Results

References

Women's 500 m time trial
European Track Championships – Women's 500 m time trial